Embers is a 1942 novel by the Hungarian writer Sándor Márai. Its original Hungarian title is A gyertyák csonkig égnek, which means "Candles burn until the end". The narrative revolves around an elderly general who invites an old friend from military school for dinner; the friend had disappeared mysteriously for 41 years, and the dinner begins to resemble a trial where the friend is prosecuted for his character traits. The book was published in English in 2001.

Reception

Anna Shapiro reviewed the book for The Observer in 2002, and wrote: "Elegiac, sombre, musical, and gripping, Embers is a brilliant disquisition on friendship, one of the most ambitious in literature." Shapiro continued: "About a milieu and values that were already dying before the outbreak of World War II, it has the grandeur and sharpness of Jean Renoir's 1937 movie masterpiece La Grande Illusion, with which it shares, in both oblique and pronounced ways, some of its substance."

Adaptations
In 2006, Embers was adapted into a stage play by Christopher Hampton, starring Jeremy Irons and Patrick Malahide.
Le braci (Italian for Embers) is a 2015 adaptation of the novel into an opera by Italian composer Marco Tutino.

See also
 1942 in literature
 Hungarian literature

References

1942 novels
Hungarian novels
Novels set in the 1940s
Novels adapted into operas